On November 7–8, 1957, a significant tornado outbreak affected portions of the Southern United States, particularly the Golden Triangle of Southeast Texas and parts of Acadiana in Louisiana. The severe weather event inflicted 14 deaths and nearly 200 injuries, especially in the vicinity of Beaumont and Port Arthur, Texas. The most significant tornado of the outbreak, posthumously rated F4 on the Fujita scale, killed one person, injured 81 others, and caused $2.5 million in losses. In all, at least 20 tornadoes were confirmed, yet others were likely present as well.

Background
On November 7, 1957, a potent trough passed over the Central United States. Meanwhile, a vigorous subtropical jet stream—possibly related to ongoing El Niño conditions—bearing winds of up to  impinged on South Texas.

Daily statistics

At least three unconfirmed tornadoes were reported in Alabama. Two F1 tornadoes each may have also struck Grand Prairie and Mossville in St. Landry and Calcasieu parishes, Louisiana, respectively.

Confirmed tornadoes

November 7 event

November 8 event

Drivers Store–Crisp–Gold Point–Quitsna, North Carolina

This intense, long-tracked F3 tornado first touched down east of Drivers Store and immediately produce heavy damage to rural areas as it moved east-northeast. Damage in Wilson County reached $250,000 and one person was injured.

Once in Edgecombe County, the strong tornado continued to wreak havoc, damaging trees and structures as it moved east-northeast. The tornado hit the south and east sides of Crisp, producing more damage. It then crossed over the Tar River south of Old Sparta, and hugged the Edgecombe–Pitt County line. More damage occurred as the tornado passed between Conetoe and Bethel before the tornado moved into Martin County. Five people were injured and $250,000 in damage was inflicted in Edgecombe and Pitt Counties.

After entering Martin County, the tornado took a very small left turn and began moving northeastward. It just barely missed Gold Point, with heavy damage occurring in the area. It then moved back into rural areas, crossing the Roanoke River into Bertie County, North Carolina. It then struck the town of Quitsna head on, severely damaging multiple structures. The tornado then moved back into rural areas, weakened, and dissipated west of Windsor. Throughout Martin and Bertie County, one person was injured and damages totaled $250,000.

Five people were injured. Along its entire path, the tornado destroyed or significantly damaged 18 homes and 23 farms, primarily near Rocky Mount and across the northern portion of Wilson County.

Non-tornadic effects
Significant thunderstorm winds were recorded throughout the event as well. On November 7, a  wind gust was recorded in Beaumont, Texas.

See also
List of North American tornadoes and tornado outbreaks
Tornado outbreak of November 2004

Notes

References

Tornadoes of 1957
F4 tornadoes
1957 in Louisiana
1957 in Texas